Mindon is a town in Burma. It is the capital of Mindon Township of Thayet District in the Magway Region.

References

Populated places in Thayet District
Township capitals of Myanmar
Mindon Township